These are the Lithuanian football standings from 1931–1940.

1931

 1 KSS Klaipeda                6  4  2  0  24-  7  17  10
 2 Kovas Kaunas                6  4  0  2  22- 14   8   8
 3 Freya Klaipeda              6  3  1  2   7- 16  -9   7
 4 Sveikata Kybartai           6  2  2  2  14- 14   0   6
 5 LGSF Kaunas                 6  3  0  3  12- 12   0   6
 6 LFLS Kaunas                 6  2  1  3  11- 10   1   5
 7 Tauras Kaunas               6  0  0  6   1- 18 -17   0

 Promotion
   Makabi Kaunas - Tauras Kaunas  (1:2)  +:-
   Makabi Siauliai

1932

 1 LFLS Kaunas                 7  6  0  1  20-  6  14  12
 2 KSS Klaipeda                7  5  2  0  29-  7  22  12
 3 LGSF Kaunas                 7  3  2  2  18-  9   9   8
 4 Sveikata Kybartai           7  4  0  3  12-  9   3   8
 5 Kovas Kaunas                7  2  3  2  18-  9   9   7
 6 Makabi Kaunas               7  2  1  4   9- 29 -20   5
 7 Freya VfR Klaipeda          7  1  1  5   5- 10  -5   3
 8 Makabi Siauliai             7  0  1  6   2- 34 -32   1

 Final

   LFLS Kaunas - KSS Klaipeda  6:1

 Promotion
   Spielvereiningung Klaipeda
   SSK Siauliai

1933

 1 Kovas Kaunas               12  8  3  1  33- 13  20  19
 2 LFLS Kaunas                12  7  4  1  23- 16   7  18
 3 LGSF Kaunas                12  5  2  5  37- 27  10  12
 4 KSS Klaipeda               12  5  1  6  28- 24   4  11
 5 Spielvereiningung Klaipeda 12  5  1  6  11- 15  -4  11 *
 6 Makabi Kaunas              12  1  4  7  13- 36 -23   6 *
 7 Sveikata Kybartai          12  0  5  7  10- 24 -14   5

 Promotion
   MSK Kaunas
   Makabi Panevezys

1934

 1 MSK Kaunas                 11  6  2  3  30- 14  16  14
 2 LFLS Kaunas                11  6  2  3  28- 12  16  14
 3 LGSF Kaunas                11  6  2  3  31- 18  13  14
 4 Kovas Kaunas               11  5  3  3  34- 15  19  13
 5 KSS Klaipeda               11  4  2  5  22- 33 -11  10
 6 Sveikata Kybartai          11  2  3  6  19- 36 -17   7
 7 Makabi Panevezys            6  0  0  6   2- 38 -36   0

 Final

   MSK Kaunas - LFLS Kaunas  2:2  5:1

 Promotion
   Tauras Kaunas - Kovas Kaunas  1:4  3:1  3:1

1935

 Kaunas Group

 1 Kovas Kaunas               10  6  1  3  24- 15   9  13
 2 MSK Kaunas                 10  5  3  2  21-  8  13  13
 3 LFLS Kaunas                10  4  3  3  23- 18   5  11
 4 LGSF Kaunas                10  3  4  3  18- 24  -6  10
 5 Tauras Kaunas              10  2  3  5  10- 18  -8   7
 6 CJSO Kaunas                10  2  2  6  10- 23 -13   6

 Final

   Kovas Kaunas - MSK Kaunas  (2:1)  +:-

 Klaipeda Group

 1 KSS Klaipeda                4  4  0  0  24-  1  23   8
 2 Saulys Klaipeda             4  2  0  2   6- 11  -5   4
 3 MSK Klaipeda                3  1  0  2   5- 13  -8   2
 4 KDS Klaipeda                3  0  0  3   1- 11 -10   0

 Siauliai Group

 1 Sakalas Šiauliai            5  5  0  0  25-  1  24  10
 2 VIII pestinink. plk.        5  3  1  1  18- 14   4   7
 3 SSK Siauliai                5  3  1  1  16- 13   3   7
 4 Makabi Siauliai             5  1  1  3  11- 18  -7   3
 5 LGSF Siauliai               5  1  1  3   7- 18 -11   3
 6 JSO Siauliai                5  0  0  5   3- 16 -13   0

 Panevezys Group

 1 Saulys Panevezys            2  2  0  0   9-  1   8   4
 2 MSK Panevezys               2  1  0  1   6-  4   2   2
 3 JSO Panevezys               2  0  0  2   1- 11 -10   0

 Suduva Group
   Orija Kalvarija - Sveikata Kybartai  2:1

 Ukmerge Group
   Saulys Ukmerge - Sparta Ukmerge  4:0

 Zemaitija Group
   Dziugas Telsiai - Saulys Seda  3:1

 1/8 Final
   Sakalas Siauliai - Dziugas Telsiai  3:1

 1/4 Final
   Saulys Ukmerge - Orija Kalvarija  5:0
   Sakalas Siauliai - Saulys Panevezys  +:-

 SemiFinal
   Kovas Kaunas - Saulys Ukmerge  6:2
   KSS Klaipeda - Sakalas Siauliai  7:0

 Final

   Kovas Kaunas - KSS Klaipeda  3:2

1936

 1 Kovas Kaunas                7  7  0  0  25-  3  22  14
 2 LFLS Kaunas                 7  5  0  2  15- 13   2  10
 3 LGSF Kaunas                 7  4  0  3  12- 12   0   8
 4 MSK Kaunas                  7  3  1  3  13-  7   6   7
 5 Tauras Kaunas               7  3  0  4  11- 16  -5   6
 6 CJSO Kaunas                 7  3  0  4   7- 15  -8   6
 7 KSS Klaipeda                7  2  1  4  18- 15   3   5
 8 Saulys Klaipeda             7  0  0  7   5- 25 -20   0

1937

 1 KSS Klaipeda               16 13  2  1  61- 17  44  28
 2 Kovas Kaunas               16  8  5  3  33- 19  14  21
 3 LFLS Kaunas                16  8  5  3  28- 15  13  21
 4 MSK Kaunas                 16  8  4  4  17- 12   5  20
 5 CJSO Kaunas                16  6  6  4  16- 17  -1  18
 6 LGSF Kaunas                16  6  1  9  23- 24  -1  13
 7 Svyturys Klaipeda          16  4  2 10  18- 30 -12  10
 8 Tauras Kaunas              16  3  2 11  20- 37 -17   8
 9 Saulys Marijampole         16  0  5 11  10- 55 -45   5

1937/38

  1 KSS Klaipeda              18 12  2  4  54- 20  34  26
  2 LGSF Kaunas               18 12  2  4  43- 18  25  26
  3 Svyturys Klaipeda         18 11  2  5  34- 20  14  24
  4 Kovas Kaunas              18  9  5  4  44- 24  20  23
  5 MSK Kaunas                18  7  7  4  36- 25  11  21
  6 LFLS Kaunas               18  8  4  6  34- 22  12  20
  7 CJSO Kaunas               18  7  2  9  30- 30   0  16
  8 Makabi Kaunas             18  5  3 10  25- 45 -20  13
  9 JSO Kybartai              18  2  2 14  15- 60 -45   6
 10 Sakalas Siauliai          18  2  1 15  15- 66 -51   5

 Final

   KSS Klaipeda - LGSF Kaunas  3:1

 Promotion
   Tauras Kaunas - Makabi Kaunas  1:2  5:0  4:1
   Sudavija Vilkaviskis
   Dziugas Telsiai

1938/39

 1 LGSF Kaunas                13  8  1  4  31- 20  11  17
 2 Kovas Kaunas               13  8  0  5  28- 18  10  16
 3 KSS Klaipeda/Telsiai       13  8  0  5  34- 31   3  16
 4 Tauras Kaunas              13  5  3  5  21- 17   4  13
 5 CJSO Kaunas                13  5  3  5  23- 24  -1  13
 6 LFLS Kaunas                13  4  3  6  20- 25  -5  11
 7 MSK Kaunas                 13  4  1  8  15- 26 -11   9
 8 Svyturys Klaipeda           7  1  1  5   9- 20 -11   3

 Note: Germany Invasion in Klaipeda

1939/40

 Autumn

 1 LGSF Kaunas                 7  5  2  0  22-  4  18  12
 2 Tauras Kaunas               7  4  1  2  16- 10   6   9
 3 LFLS Kaunas                 6  4  0  2  19- 11   8   8
 4 CJSO Kaunas                 7  4  0  3  11-  7   4   8
 5 MSK Kaunas                  7  3  1  3   8- 10  -2   7
 6 KSS Telsiai                 6  2  1  3   3- 10  -7   5
 7 Sakalas Siauliai            7  2  0  5   6- 17 -11   4
 8 Kovas Kaunas                7  0  1  6   8- 24 -16   1

 Spring

 Kaunas Group

 1 LGSF Kaunas                 8  5  3  0  20-  3  17  13
 2 Tauras Kaunas               8  4  3  1  22- 13   9  11
 3 LFLS Kaunas                 8  3  2  3  25- 17   8   8
 4 MSK Kaunas                  8  2  1  5  10- 24 -14   5
 5 Kovas Kaunas                8  1  1  6  12- 32 -20   3

 Zemaitija Group

 1 Sakalas Siauliai            4  4  0  0  13-  3  10   8
 2 KSS Telsiai                 4  3  0  1  22-  4  18   6
 3 Zinia Siauliai              4  1  1  2   7-  7   0   3
 4 Makabi Siauliai             4  1  1  2   5- 18 -13   3
 5 Dziugas Telsiai             4  0  0  4   1- 16 -15   0

Sources
RSSF/Almantas Lahzadis

Football in Lithuania